"Mad About the Boy" is a popular song with words and music by actor and playwright Noël Coward. It was introduced in the 1932 revue Words and Music by Joyce Barbour, Steffi Duna, Norah Howard and Doris Hare. The song deals with the theme of unrequited love for a film star. It was written to be sung by female characters, although Coward (who was homosexual) also wrote a version which was never performed, containing references to the then-risqué topic of homosexual love. The song gained new popularity in 1992 when Dinah Washington's rendition was used in the Levi's television advertisement "Swimmer", directed by Tarsem Singh.

Lyrics
The song expresses the adulation of a matinee idol by a number of women as they queue outside a cinema and is sung by several female characters in turn. The adoring fans sing of their love for their hero:

Coward later wrote additional verses for the New York production, to be sung by a male character. The lyrics make explicit reference to homosexual feelings with lines such as:

The lyrics also make camp humorous reference to the supposed effeminacy of the character, who is likened to the contemporary film actress Myrna Loy, and to his repeated unsuccessful attempts at conversion therapy with his psychiatrist. The verses were never performed, as the management thought them too risqué.

"The boy" was rumoured to be actor Douglas Fairbanks Jr, who, according to an American newspaper years later, "Noel loved...[but] Doug definitely didn't love him back, although the two men became good friends." Another Hollywood star, Tyrone Power, has also been the rumoured subject of the song.

Dinah Washington version

Dinah Washington recorded the song twice: firstly, on 24 March 1952 with orchestral accompaniment by Walter Roddell, and then on 4 December 1961 with Quincy Jones and his orchestra. Her 1961 recording is possibly the most widely known version of the song. The  time arrangement for voice and jazz orchestra by Jones omits two verses and was recorded in the singer's native Chicago on the Mercury label.

Her 1952 version was released as a single, but the 1961 version was not given a single release until 1992. The song was one of the 40 songs she recorded with Quincy Jones in 1961. Some of these were issued on two albums: I Wanna Be Loved and Tears and Laughter, both released in 1962. The song "Tears And Laughter" was released as a single, but "Mad About the Boy" remained unreleased until Golden Hits – Volume One, a 1963 compilation. By that point, Washington had moved from the Mercury label to Roulette. The recording was also issued on other Washington compilations.

Washington's version was popularised for a new generation when it was used as a backing track in a 1992 television advertisement for Levi's jeans. In the commercial, which is influenced by the 1968 Burt Lancaster film The Swimmer, a young man runs through an American suburban neighbourhood stripping down to only his jeans, invades private gardens and dives into a series of swimming pools to shrink his jeans. Washington's recording was re-released by Mercury as a tie-in in with the advertising campaign, and the cover art featured a shot of the shirtless man emerging from a swimming pool and bore the Levi's logo. The single entered the Top 50 in the UK Singles Chart.

Other recordings

 Noël Coward with orchestra conducted by Ray Noble in London on 20 September 1932. The recording was not issued at the time but has been included on CD collections.
 Caro Emerald with Jools Holland's Rhythm and Blues Orchestra on the album 'The Golden Age of Song' (2012).
 Phyllis Robins with Jack Hylton & his Orchestra in London on 3 October 1932.
 Anona Winn with the Blue Lyres in London in October 1932.
 Elsie Carlisle with Ray Starita & his Ambassadors Band in London on 5 November 1932.
 Maxine Sullivan on 1 May 1940.
 Patti Page on the album The Waltz Queen
 Jessica Biel on the soundtrack for the film Easy Virtue (adapted from the Nöel Coward play)
 Helen Forrest in 1949, later used in the video game Fallout: New Vegas

The song has been performed by a number of other artists, including:

 Belle Baker
 Georgia Brown – Georgia Brown (1963)
 Blossom Dearie
 Buddy DeFranco
 Marianne Faithfull
 Frances Faye
 Maria Friedman
 Jackie Gleason
 Gogi Grant
 Glen Gray and the Casa Loma Orchestra
 Joyce Grenfell
 Dick and Kiz Harp – At the 90th Floor (1960) 90th Floor Records
 Lena Horne
 Greta Keller
 Eartha Kitt
 Cleo Laine
 Gertrude Lawrence
 Amanda Lear – Let Me Entertain You (2016)
 Beatrice Lillie
 Julie London – London by Night (1958)
 Andrea Marcovicci
 Billy May – The Ultimate (2002)
 Marian McPartland – At the Hickory House (1996)
 Carmen McRae
 Anita O'Day
 Esther Ofarim 1968
 Cybill Shepherd, as the title track for her 1978 album with Stan Getz
 Elaine Paige on her 1993 album Romance & the Stage
 Miss Piggy (as Mad About the Frog)
 Tom RobinsonCabaret '79 (1982)
 Dinah Shore
 Sheridan Smith
 Jeri Southern – The Dream's on Jeri (1998)
 Cécile McLorin Salvant
 Adam Lambert (2022)

References

External links
Sold on Song: bbc.co.uk, accessed 6 January 2009
Levi's 1992 "Swimmer" commercial dead link
[https://www.youtube.com/watch?v=c4Kz7e7B7_E Esther Ofarim – Mad about the boy

Songs written by Noël Coward
Lena Horne songs
1932 songs
Dinah Washington songs
Tom Robinson songs
Mercury Records singles
Torch songs
LGBT-related songs